Zorana (Zoya) Popović is a Serbian American microwave engineer, currently Hudson Moore Jr. Endowed Chair and Distinguished Professor at the University of Colorado.
Popović was named a Fellow of the IEEE in 2002, "for contributions to the development of active antenna arrays and quasi-optical power combining techniques".

References

External links

1962
Living people
University of Colorado faculty
21st-century American engineers
California Institute of Technology alumni
Fellow Members of the IEEE
1962 births